Ruby Trax - The NME's Roaring Forty is a compilation album released by the 'rock inkie' (newspaper) NME (New Musical Express) in 1992 to commemorate 40 years of publication. The album features 40 cover versions of classic Number 1 songs by popular bands of the era, though as the NME based it on the NME's own chart, some songs (such as Ultravox's "Vienna" recorded by Vic Reeves) did not reach number one on the British Market Research Bureau/Gallup chart (now branded as the Official Singles Chart). It was released in the following formats: three LPs (NME40LP), three CDs (NME40CD) or two cassettes (NME40MC), all having a total of 40 songs.

The album spawned a double A-side single featuring Manic Street Preachers' version of "Suicide Is Painless", which was listed as "Theme from M.A.S.H.", and The Fatima Mansions' take on Bryan Adams' "(Everything I Do) I Do It for You" . The 12" and CD versions of the single included an interview with Steve Lamacq about the infamous '4 Real' incident. This was entitled "Sleeping with the NME" and credited to the Manic Street Preachers. The single peaked at #7 in the UK Singles Chart.

All proceeds from the album went to the charity The Spastics Society.

Track listings

3-CD version

See also
 Sgt. Pepper Knew My Father - the NME charity album featuring the Number One double-A sided hit "With a Little Help from My Friends" by Wet Wet Wet / "She's Leaving Home" by Billy Bragg with Cara Tivey.
 List of NME number-one singles of the 1980s - from the NME's rival to charts broadcast by BBC Radio One and Independent Local Radio (Network Chart)

References

1992 compilation albums
Covers albums
Charity albums
Pop compilation albums
Compilation albums included with magazines